Tricholoma virgatum, commonly known as the ashen knight, is a mushroom of the agaric genus Tricholoma. It was first described scientifically as Agaricus virgatus by Elias Fries in 1818, and later transferred to the genus Tricholoma by Paul Kummer in 1871. It is found in the deciduous and coniferous forests of Europe and North America. The mushroom is inedible, speculated to be poisonous, and has a bitter and peppery taste and musty odor.

The cap is silvery and conical, with streaks of fibres. A similar species is Tricholoma sciodes.

See also
List of North American Tricholoma
List of Tricholoma species

References

virgatum
Fungi described in 1818
Fungi of Europe
Fungi of North America
Taxa named by Elias Magnus Fries